The Women's Party was a feminist political party in Greenland inspired by the Icelandic women's movement. It was formed by a group of women in response to the low representation of women in politics.  At the 2002 legislative elections, the party won 2.4% of the popular vote and no seats. It was dissolved in the spring of 2008.

References

Feminist parties in Europe
Feminism in Greenland
Feminist parties in North America
Political parties established in 1999
Political parties disestablished in 2008
Defunct political parties in Greenland
1999 establishments in Greenland
2008 disestablishments in Greenland
Feminist organisations in Greenland